Skoyles is a surname. Notable people with the surname include:

John Skoyles (disambiguation), multiple people
Edward Skoyles (1923–2008), English surveyor